Charles Edward Dench (September 6, 1873 – June 28, 1958) was an English first-class cricketer and Test match umpire. Born in 1873 in East Stoke, Nottinghamshire, he played 91 matches for Nottinghamshire as a right-handed batsman and right arm medium bowler between 1897 and 1902. He scored 2660 runs with a best of 88 and took 78 wickets, including a haul of 7 for 28. He then turned to umpiring, standing in the 1909 Ashes Test at Lord's. He died in 1958 in Sherwood, Nottingham.

References

External links 
Charles Dench at CricketArchive

1873 births
English cricketers
Nottinghamshire cricketers
English Test cricket umpires
1958 deaths